The 2018–19 Top League Cup was the inaugural edition of the Top League Cup, a cup competition for Japan's Top League teams.

Competition rules

The sixteen Top League teams were divided into four pools for the first stage of the competition; each team played the three other teams in their pools once.

All sixteen teams then progressed to a play-off stage; the top teams in each pool advanced to the cup play-offs, the second-placed teams in each pool to the 5th-place play-offs, the third-placed teams in each pool to the 9th-place play-offs and the bottom teams in each pool to the 13th-place play-offs, which determined the final positions for the season.

Teams

The following teams took part in the 2018–19 Top League Cup competition:

First Stage : Pool A

Standings

The current standings for the 2018–19 Top League Cup First Stage Pool A are:

Matches

The 2018–19 Top League Cup First Stage Pool A fixtures are:

Round 1

Round 2

Round 3

First Stage : Pool B

Standings

The current standings for the 2018–19 Top League Cup First Stage Pool B are:

Matches

The 2018–19 Top League Cup First Stage Pool B fixtures are:

Round 1

Round 2

Round 3

First Stage : Pool C

Standings

The current standings for the 2018–19 Top League Cup First Stage Pool C are:

Matches

The 2018–19 Top League Cup First Stage Pool C fixtures are:

Round 1

Round 2

Round 3

First Stage : Pool D

Standings

The current standings for the 2018–19 Top League Cup First Stage Pool D are:

Matches

The 2018–19 Top League Cup First Stage Pool D fixtures are:

Round 1

Round 2

Round 3

Second stage

Standings

The final standings for the 2018–19 Top League Cup were:

Cup play-offs

The two semi-final winners qualified for the final, while the losers qualified for the 3rd-place match.

The final matches determined the final standings.

5th-place play-offs

The two 5th-place semi-final winners qualified for the 5th-place match, while the losers qualified for the 7th-place match.

The final matches determined the final standings.

9th-place play-offs

The two 9th-place semi-final winners qualified for the 9th-place match, while the losers qualified for the 11th-place match.

The final matches determined the final standings.

13th-place play-offs

The two 13th-place semi-final winners qualified for the 13th-place match, while the losers qualified for the 15th-place match.

The final matches determined the final standings.

See also

 2018–19 Top League
 2018 Top Challenge League

References

2018
2018–19 in Japanese rugby union
2018–19 rugby union tournaments for clubs